Niurka Moreno (born 12 October 1972) is a Cuban judoka. She competed in the women's half-heavyweight event at the 1992 Summer Olympics.

References

1972 births
Living people
Cuban female judoka
Olympic judoka of Cuba
Judoka at the 1992 Summer Olympics
Place of birth missing (living people)
Pan American Games medalists in judo
Pan American Games gold medalists for Cuba
Judoka at the 1991 Pan American Games
Medalists at the 1991 Pan American Games
20th-century Cuban women
21st-century Cuban women